Nesdon Foye Booth (September 1, 1918 – March 25, 1964) was an American film and television actor. He appeared in over 100 films and television programs, and was known for his recurring role as Frank the bartender in the American western television series Cimarron City.

Booth was born in Baker County, Oregon. He began his career in Portland, Oregon, acting on old-time radio programs. He guest-starred in numerous television programs including Gunsmoke, Bonanza, The Twilight Zone, Sky King, Colt .45, Tales of Wells Fargo, 77 Sunset Strip, The Lawless Years, Lawman, Father Knows Best, The Life and Legend of Wyatt Earp, Man with a Camera, Peter Gunn and Perry Mason. Booth died in March 1964 of a heart attack in Hollywood, California. He was buried in Olive Lawn Memorial Park.

Partial filmography 

 City Across the River (1949) - Boy (uncredited)
 The Girl in White (1952) - Sailor (uncredited)
 Sally and Saint Anne (1952) - Fight Fan (uncredited)
 The Glass Wall (1953) - Monroe
 I Love Melvin (1953) - Police Captain (uncredited)
 The 49th Man (1953) - Sheriff Ramirez (uncredited)
 Executive Suite (1954) - Guest (uncredited)
 Rogue Cop (1954) - Detective Garrett
 Black Widow (1954) - Police A.P.B. Man (uncredited)
 Pete Kelly's Blues (1955) - Squat Henchman (uncredited)
 I Died a Thousand Times (1955) - Tom (uncredited)
 I'll Cry Tomorrow (1955) - Pawnbroker (uncredited)
 Three Bad Sisters (1956) - Coroner (uncredited)
 The Price of Fear (1956) - Gorin (uncredited)
 Santiago (1956) - Burns
 These Wilder Years (1956) - Pool Room Proprietor (uncredited)
 Funny Face (1957) - Southern Man (uncredited)
 Mister Cory (1957) - Fat Man (uncredited)
 The Shadow on the Window (1957) - Conway the Truck Driver (uncredited)
 Reform School Girl (1957) - Deetz
 The Brothers Rico (1957) - Burly Man (uncredited)
 Raintree County (1957) - Spectator (uncredited)
 Escape from Red Rock (1957) - Pete Archer
 Sing Boy Sing (1958) - Police Desk Sergeant (uncredited)
 Too Much, Too Soon (1958) - Spectator (uncredited)
 Cattle Empire (1958) - Barkeep
 Damn Yankees (1958) - Baseball Game Spectator (uncredited)
 Rio Bravo (1959) - Clark
 The Big Circus (1959) - Jules Borman (uncredited)
 The FBI Story (1959) - Sandy the Driver (uncredited)
 Yellowstone Kelly (1959) - Reed the Burly Soldier (uncredited)
 The Rise and Fall of Legs Diamond (1960) - Fence/Pawnbroker (uncredited)
 Bells Are Ringing (1960) - Mike the Coffee Shop Proprietor (uncredited)
 Let No Man Write My Epitaph (1960) - Mike the Saloon Owner (uncredited)
 The Wackiest Ship in the Army (1960) - Chief Petty Officer (uncredited)
 One-Eyed Jacks (1961) - Townsman (uncredited)
 Ada (1961) - Walter Dow
 Claudelle Inglish (1961) - Farmer in Peasley's Store (uncredited)
 Gun Street (1961) - Mayor Phillips
 Walk on the Wild Side (1962) - Guard in Teresina's Cafe (uncredited)
 Billy Rose's Jumbo (1962) - Marshall (uncredited)
 Critic's Choice (1963) - Minor Role (uncredited)
 What a Way to Go! (1964) - Restaurant Patron (uncredited)
 The Greatest Story Ever Told (1965) - (uncredited)

References

External links 

Rotten Tomatoes profile

1918 births
1964 deaths
People from Baker County, Oregon
Male actors from Oregon
American male film actors
American male television actors
American male radio actors
20th-century American male actors
University of Oregon alumni
Western (genre) television actors
Burials in California